Craig Charles Colbert (born February 13, 1965) is a former Major League Baseball catcher and former bench coach for the San Diego Padres.

A 1983 graduate out of Manhattan High School, Colbert was selected in the 20th round of the 1986 Major League Baseball draft by the San Francisco Giants. He played in their farm system until making his debut at the beginning of the  season, and played in 72 games over two seasons, being released after the  season.

Colbert played several more seasons in the minor leagues, first for the Cleveland Indians, then for the San Diego Padres. In , Colbert became a player-coach for the Las Vegas Stars, ending his playing career after that season. From  through , Colbert worked his way up the Padres' chain, managing at four different levels of the minor leagues.

In , he was named the Padres' bench coach, a position from which he was let go on September 29,  following a 99 loss season.  It seems that he and hitting coach Wally Joyner were the scapegoats for the disappointing season.  Though upper management's inability to put proven talent on the field, the team's bottom ranking in MLB at scoring runs, next to last ranking in team batting average, injuries to Jake Peavy and Chris Young, and their paltry 36 stolen bases for the whole season (a total that 11 players in the AL and NL surpassed on their own) heavily contributed to their lackluster season.  He is currently a scout for the Philadelphia Phillies.

Sources 

Baseball Reference
Baseball Reference (Minors)
Retrosheet
The Baseball Gauge
Venezuela Winter League

References 

1965 births
Living people
Baseball players from Iowa
Charlotte Knights players
Clinton Giants players
Fresno Giants players
Las Vegas Stars (baseball) players
Leones del Caracas players
American expatriate baseball players in Venezuela
Major League Baseball bench coaches
Major League Baseball catchers
Oral Roberts Golden Eagles baseball players
Oral Roberts University alumni
Sportspeople from Iowa City, Iowa
Philadelphia Phillies scouts
Phoenix Firebirds players
Portland Beavers managers
San Diego Padres coaches
San Diego Padres managers
San Francisco Giants players